Bhatakul is a village in Bhatar, Bardhaman Sadar North subdivision, Purba Bardhaman district, in the state of West Bengal, India. Bhatakul is administrated by an elected sarpanch (village head) who represents the people of the village, as directed by the Constitution of India and the Panchyati Raaj Act.

History
The 2011 Census of India identifies Bhatakul's village location code (VLC) or village code (VC) as 319838. The village is located in the Bharat Tehsil of Burdwan district in West Bengal, India, and is situated 13.3 km away from sub-district headquarters Bhatar. Barddhaman is the district headquarters of Bhatakul village. Per 2009 statistics, Bologna is the gram panchayat of Bhatakul village.

Transportation 
The journey to Bhatakul from the town of Purba Bardhaman can be made by bus or by rail via the nearest railway station, Bhatar.

Population 
Bhatakul had a population of 5,607 people and 1,265 families. In Bhatakul, Schedule Castes (SC) represent 21.56% of the total population, and Scheduled Tribes (ST) represent 0.50% of the population.

Population and house data

Healthcare
There are currently no hospitals in Bhatakul.

Schools
There are two schools in Bhatakul: Bhatakul Pubbapara F.P. School (established in 1972) and Bhatakul Swarnamoyee High School (established in 1914).

References 

Villages in Purba Bardhaman district